Chiloglottis anaticeps, commonly known as the duck's-head wasp orchid or bird orchid is a species of orchid endemic to the New England Tableland of New South Wales. It has two narrow leaves and a single greenish brown or reddish flower with a shiny, dark green callus occupying most of the top of the labellum. One end of the callus looks like a tiny duck's head.

Description
Flowering occurs from December to February.

Taxonomy and naming
Chiloglottis anaticeps was first formally described in 1991 by David Jones from a specimen collected west of Wauchope and the description was published in Australian Orchid Research. The specific epithet (anaticeps) means "duck-headed" and refers to the stalked gland on the labellum.

Distribution and habitat
The duck's-head wasp orchid grows in tall forest and near granite outcrops in the New England, Werrikimbe and Cathedral Rock National Parks.

Conservation
Chiloglottis anaticeps is listed as "endangered" under the New South Wales Government Biodiversity Conservation Act 2016.

References

External links 

anaticeps
Orchids of New South Wales
Plants described in 1991